Jhondly van der Meer (born on 22 March 2002) is a professional footballer who plays as a midfielder for Dutch Eredivisie club SC Cambuur. Born in the Dominican Republic, he represents the Haiti national team.

Early life
Van der Meer (then Saint Juste) was born as Haitian in the neighbouring Dominican Republic since his biological parents were Haitian and they were not regularised there. He was raised in Haiti until he was 6, when he was adopted by a Dutch family, the Van der Meers, who took him to live with them in Leeuwarden, Netherlands. He is now a naturalised Dutch citizen.

International career
Van der Meer is followed by the under-23 national coach of the Dominican Republic, where he was born, despite he is not a Dominican national. He is also on the Haiti national team radar.

Career statistics

Club

Notes

References

External links
 Career stats - Voetbal International

2002 births
Living people
Sportspeople from Santo Domingo
Haitians born in the Dominican Republic
Haitian footballers
Association football midfielders
Haiti international footballers
Haitian emigrants to the Netherlands
Naturalised citizens of the Netherlands
Dutch adoptees
Footballers from Leeuwarden
Dutch footballers
SC Cambuur players
Eerste Divisie players
Eredivisie players
Dutch people of Haitian descent